Adolf Kofler (12 January 1892 – 13 March 1915) was an Austrian road racing cyclist who competed in the 1912 Summer Olympics.

He was born in Graz. In 1912 he was a member of the Austrian cycling team which finished seventh in the team time trial event. In the individual time trial competition he finished 31st. He was killed in action during World War I.

See also
 List of Olympians killed in World War I

References

External links
Adolf Kofler's obituary 

1892 births
1915 deaths
Austrian male cyclists
Olympic cyclists of Austria
Cyclists at the 1912 Summer Olympics
Sportspeople from Graz
Austro-Hungarian military personnel killed in World War I